is a Japanese football player.

Career
After gaining some playing-time with FC Tokyo and Shonan Bellmare, he has been called by Japan in August 2015.

On 4 July 2018, Nagoya Grampus announced the signing of Maruyama.

International career
Maruyama has been called for some training camps, but in the end he received his first call-up on 26 May 2016 to face the 2016 Kirin Cup.

Club statistics
Updated to 19 July 2022.

National team statistics

References

External links
 Profile at FC Tokyo
 
 
 

1989 births
Living people
Meiji University alumni
Association football people from Tokyo
Japanese footballers
Japan international footballers
J1 League players
J2 League players
J3 League players
FC Tokyo players
FC Tokyo U-23 players
Shonan Bellmare players
Nagoya Grampus players
Association football defenders
Universiade gold medalists for Japan
Universiade medalists in football
Medalists at the 2011 Summer Universiade